Used Cars is a 1980 American satirical black comedy film co-written and directed by Robert Zemeckis. The story follows Rudy Russo (Kurt Russell), a devious salesman, working for affable, but monumentally unsuccessful used-car dealer Luke Fuchs (Jack Warden). Luke's principal rival, located directly across the street, is his more prosperous brother, Roy L. Fuchs (also played by Warden), who is scheming to take over Luke's lot. The film also stars Deborah Harmon and Gerrit Graham, and the supporting cast includes Frank McRae, David L. Lander, Michael McKean, Joe Flaherty, Al Lewis, Dub Taylor, Harry Northup, Dick Miller, and Betty Thomas.

Steven Spielberg and John Milius acted as executive producers on the project, while the original musical score was composed by Patrick Williams. Filmed primarily in Mesa, Arizona, the film was released on July 11, 1980.

Although not a box-office success at the time, it has since developed cult film status due to its dark, cynical humor and the Zemeckis style. It was marketed with the tagline, "Like new, great looking, and fully loaded with laughs." It was the only Zemeckis film to be rated R by the Motion Picture Association of America until Flight (2012).

Plot 
 
Rudy Russo is a young and cunning car salesman in Mesa, Arizona, with aspirations of running for the state senate. He works at the struggling New Deal used car lot owned by the elderly Luke Fuchs, who agrees to invest $10,000 in Rudy's campaign if he promises to keep the business alive. 

Meanwhile, across the street, Luke's twin brother and arch-competitor Roy L. Fuchs is desperate to keep his used car lot from being demolished and replaced by a proposed freeway exit. Wanting to collect life insurance money and New Deal from Luke, Roy hires his mechanic, demolition derby driver Mickey, to recklessly drive Luke's pristine, hand-restored 1957 Chevrolet Bel Air around the block with Luke in the passenger's seat. 

Shortly after crashing the classic car into the lot, Luke dies of a heart attack, leaving Rudy with firm evidence that Roy staged the "accident". In an attempt to prevent Roy from gaining any inheritance, Rudy has his superstitious co-worker, Jeff and mechanic, Jim, help him bury Luke on the dealership's backlot in a vintage Edsel that was once New Deal's sign ornament. When Roy comes looking for Luke the next day, they explain that Luke took the Edsel on a vacation to Miami.

The following night, Rudy and his friends make a live cut-in broadcast of their commercial into the middle of a major network football game. It goes awry when Jeff finds out the car on display is red (he believes all red cars are bad luck) and female model Margaret has her dress stuck on the hood ornament, which rips open and exposes her when the hood is popped open. The commercial results in New Deal receiving a massive number of new customers the next day. In one deal, Jeff cons a family into buying a station wagon by having the lot's mascot dog, Toby, fake being run over during a test drive.

When Roy lures customers to his lot by hiring circus animals, Rudy counters with a live stripper show. Luke's estranged daughter Barbara Jane visits the lot in hopes of reuniting with her dad, having dropped out of college more than ten years before to live on a hippie commune. Rudy conceals the truth about her father by taking her out on a date, and inadvertently convinces her to stay in town.

Rudy's gang broadcasts another commercial in the middle of Jimmy Carter's presidential address, destroying some of Roy's used cars in the process, most notably his prized Mercedes SL. In retaliation, Roy storms into New Deal and attacks Jeff before discovering Luke's resting place in the backlot. Roy brings the police to New Deal the next day to dig up the rearlot, but Jim has taken the Edsel out of the pit, placed Luke's corpse in the driver's seat, and rigged the car to crash into a power transformer, where it explodes as planned. 

Everyone believes Luke was killed in the fiery accident, and any evidence to the contrary is destroyed. Roy believes he now has possession of New Deal, but Rudy points out that Barbara, as Luke's daughter, is effectively the new owner.

Eventually, Barbara discovers the fiasco over her father's death and fires Rudy, Jeff, and Jim for their cover-up scheme. As a final means of shutting down New Deal, Roy has his connections in local television station KFUK re-edit Barbara's commercial to imply that she has "a mile of cars", while also pushing a trumped-up charge of false advertising.

Rudy's luck changes when he wins a bet on a football game, guaranteeing him enough money for his campaign. Once he discovers that Barbara is being prosecuted for false advertising, Rudy convinces her to tell the court she has a mile of cars. To avoid a charge of perjury, she must prove it in front of the judge by having more than 250 cars on her lot by 2:45 pm that afternoon. 

Rudy spends his investment on 250 cars bought from Mexican dealer Manuel and having 250 student drivers deliver them to New Deal's lot in less than two hours. After overcoming Roy's attempt at disrupting the resulting convoy and Jeff's superstition of driving a red car, the drivers arrive just in time. The total measurements are just long enough to equal a mile of cars, saving Barbara and the car lot. Roy's former attorney informs Rudy and Barbara that once the freeway ramp across the street is constructed, New Deal will become the largest dealership in the state.

Cast 
 Kurt Russell as Rudy Russo
 Jack Warden as Roy L. Fuchs / Luke Fuchs
 Gerrit Graham as Jeff
 Frank McRae as Jim
 Deborah Harmon as Barbara Jane Fuchs
 Joe Flaherty as Sam Slaton
 David L. Lander as Freddie Paris
 Michael McKean as Eddie Winslow
 Michael Talbott as Mickey
 Harry Northup as Carmine
 Alfonso Arau as Manuel
 Cheryl Rixon as Margaret
 Al Lewis as Judge H. H. Harrison
 Woodrow Parfrey as Mr. Chertner
 Dub Taylor as Tucker
 Wendie Jo Sperber as Nona "Nervous Nona"
 Marc McClure as "Heavy Duty" Dubois
 Andrew Duncan  as Charlie
 Betty Thomas as Bunny
 Dick Miller as Man In Bed
 Rita Taggart as Woman In Bed
 Terence Knox as Reese
 Will McMillan as Police Sergeant

Production

Development
The idea for Used Cars originated from producer John Milius, who pitched it to Gale and Zemeckis while they were writing the script for 1941 (1979), the parody film directed by Steven Spielberg. Milius said that he and Spielberg had hoped to one day write a story about a used car salesman based outside Las Vegas.

Casting
They had wanted to cast actor George Hamilton as Kurt Russell's character, Rudy. Universal Pictures passed on the film, leading the duo to take it to Columbia Pictures. Frank Price, the studio president at the time, had sold used cars as a young man, and he quickly said yes. According to Bob Gale, Jack Warden had initially passed on the role of Roy Fuchs, but agreed to play the role under the condition that he be able to play Luke Fuchs, since he was interested in playing the role of both brothers. John Candy was originally cast as Sam Slaton, but dropped out due to scheduling conflicts with 1941 and was replaced with Joe Flaherty.

Filming
The film was shot in 29 days at the working Darner Chrysler-Plymouth dealership in Mesa, Arizona, from October to November 1979. The dealership served as the setting for "Roy L. Fuchs Pre-owned Automobiles", while a vacant lot across the street served as the setting for "New Deal Used Cars". The vacant lot now has an apartment complex, while the Chrysler bankruptcy of 2009 caused the Darner dealership to lose its Chrysler affiliation. Many local police officers worked in the film in several capacities, including the "cowboy" Shotgun role. Kurt Russell produced some commercials for Darner's, inviting customers to come in and shop while the film was still being shot.

In the scene where Rudy and Jeff are burying the Edsel on the backlot and are confronted by Roy and Sam over Luke's whereabouts, Gerrit Graham repeated some of Kurt Russell's lines, which was not in the script. Jack Warden was so angered over the impromptu ad-libbing that he ended the scene with his own ad-libbed "What are you, a fuckin' parrot?" directed at Graham. Luke Fuch's old Edsel switches back and forth between 1958 and 1959 model years. When it is sitting on top of the pole as the car lot sign, it is a 1959 model. When it is dropped to the ground in which to bury Luke, and when it is dug-up, started, and drives across the car lot with the dead Luke behind the wheel, it is a 1958 model Edsel. When the car hits the transformer, it is again a 1959 model, with a turquoise scallop painted on the side to match the 1958 model (only 1958 model Edsels have this feature). The judge's props for the music video for Sammy Hagar's song "I Can't Drive 55" were borrowed from Zemeckis, who in turn used Hagar's song as Marty enters the alternate Hill Valley in Back to the Future Part II). The excerpts of President Carter's televised speech used in the film were taken from his Oval Office address on his Administration's anti-inflation program, broadcast on October 24, 1978.

Release

Home media
Shout! Factory re-released Used Cars on Blu-ray February 26, 2019 through their Shout! Select branch. The film had been previously released by Sony Pictures Home Entertainment on January 1, 2002, as a Region 1 DVD with audio commentary by Robert Zemeckis, Kurt Russell, and Bob Gale. The film was released August 12, 2019 as a Region B Blu-ray by Eureka Entertainment Ltd., a division of their Eureka Classics product line.

Reception

Box office
Used Cars grossed $11.7 million in North America.

Critical response
On review aggregator Rotten Tomatoes, the film holds an approval rating of 77% based on 30 reviews, with an average score of 6.60/10. The website's critical consensus reads, "Robert Zemeckis' pitch-black satire of American culture doesn't always hit the mark, but it's got enough manic comic energy to warrant a spin." On Metacritic, the film received a score of 68 based on 11 reviews, indicating "generally favorable reviews".

However, early reviews were mixed. The Washington Post Gary Arnold dubbed it "a mean, spirited farce [...] Director/co-writer Robert Zemeckis has undeniable energy and flair, but it's being misspent on pretexts and situations that seem inexcusably gratuitous and snide." A staff reviewer for Variety wrote that "What might have looked like a great idea on paper has been tackled by filmmakers who haven’t expanded it much beyond the one joke inherent in the premise." They too praised Zemeckis' direction as "undeniable vigor, if insufficient control and discipline." Roger Ebert of the Chicago Sun-Times gave the film two out of four stars, saying the film is "filled with too many ideas, relationships, and situations with plot overkill."

Among the positive reviews, Dave Kehr of the Chicago Reader found it to be a "fierce, cathartically funny celebration of the low, the cheap, the venal—in short, America." Vincent Canby of The New York Times wrote, "...a movie that has more laughs in it than any film of the summer except Airplane! It wipes out...just about every other recent comedy aimed, I assume, at an otherwise television-hooked public." Pauline Kael of The New Yorker described Cars as "a classic screwball fantasy — a neglected modern comedy that’s like a more restless and visually high-spirited version of the W. C. Fields pictures."

At the time, Used Cars received the highest ratings in test screenings in Columbia Pictures history. In 2015, film critic and historian Leonard Maltin said, "I loved Used Cars, and I'll never understand really why that didn't become more." Zemeckis and Gale blamed the film's failure on Columbia, who moved the film up a month from its scheduled release date based on the test-screening response. It debuted with little advance marketing and was released only one week after Airplane!

References

External links
 
 
 
 

1980 films
1980s black comedy films
1980s satirical films
American black comedy films
American satirical films
Columbia Pictures films
Culture of Mesa, Arizona
1980s English-language films
Films about automobiles
Films about car dealerships
Films directed by Robert Zemeckis
Films scored by Patrick Williams
Films set in Phoenix, Arizona
Films set in Maricopa County, Arizona
Films shot in Arizona
Films with screenplays by Robert Zemeckis
Films with screenplays by Bob Gale
Fratricide in fiction
Used car market
Workplace comedy films
1980 comedy films
1980s American films